NPB can refer to:
NAS Parallel Benchmarks, a set of benchmarks developed by the NASA for measuring the performance of supercomputers
National Printing Bureau of Japan
National Pork Board of the United States
Nederlandsche Padvinders Bond, one of the scouting organizations that evolved into Scouting Nederland
Newport Beach a city in Orange County, California, United States
Nippon Professional Baseball, the highest level of professional baseball in Japan
Nitrate-producing bacteria, also known as nitrifying bacteria in the nitrogen cycle
Northern Black Polished Ware, a period of South Asian history
Parole Board of Canada, a Canadian government agency
NPB or n-PB, n-propyl bromide, solvent
Network packet broker, a network monitoring system